Bino Bini (23 January 1900 – 5 April 1974) was an Italian fencer. He won a gold medal at the 1924 Summer Olympics and a silver and bronze at the 1928 Summer Olympics.

References

External links
 
 

1900 births
1974 deaths
Italian male fencers
Olympic fencers of Italy
Olympic gold medalists for Italy
Olympic silver medalists for Italy
Olympic bronze medalists for Italy
Olympic medalists in fencing
Fencers at the 1924 Summer Olympics
Fencers at the 1928 Summer Olympics
Medalists at the 1924 Summer Olympics
Medalists at the 1928 Summer Olympics
Sportspeople from Livorno